Keith Emrey Carey (March 5, 1920 – February 15, 1999) was an American professional basketball player. He played for the Flint Dow A.C.'s in the National Basketball League during the 1947–48 season and averaged 3.0 points per game.

In college, Carey lettered in football, basketball, tennis, and track for Alma College.

References

1920 births
1999 deaths
Alma Scots football players
Alma Scots men's basketball players
American men's basketball coaches
American men's basketball players
United States Navy personnel of World War II
Basketball coaches from Michigan
Basketball players from Michigan
College men's tennis players in the United States
College men's track and field athletes in the United States
Flint Dow A.C.'s players
Guards (basketball)
High school basketball coaches in Michigan
People from Charlevoix, Michigan